Natalia Romanovna Makarova (born 21 November 1940) is a Russian prima ballerina and choreographer. The History of Dance, published in 1981, notes that "her performances set standards of artistry and aristocracy of dance which mark her as the finest ballerina of her generation in the West."

Biography
Makarova was born in Leningrad in the Russian SFSR of the Soviet Union. At the age of 12, she auditioned for the Leningrad Choreographic School (formerly the Imperial Ballet School), and was accepted although most students join the school at the age of 9.

Makarova was a permanent member of the Kirov Ballet in Leningrad from 1956 to 1970, achieving prima ballerina status during the 1960s. She defected to the West on 4 September 1970, while on tour with the Kirov in London. Soon after defecting, Makarova began performing with the American Ballet Theatre in New York City and the Royal Ballet in London.

When she first arrived in the West, Makarova was eager to expand her choreography by dancing ballets by modern choreographers. At the same time, she remained most identified with classical roles such as Odette/Odile in Swan Lake and Giselle. In December 1975, she and her dance partner Mikhail Baryshnikov featured prominently in an episode of the BBC television series Arena. She was featured in the 1976 live American Ballet Theatre production of Swan Lake, simulcast from Lincoln Center on both PBS and NPR. When ABT artistic director Lucia Chase stepped down, both Makarova and Baryshnikov applied. After the company went with Baryshnikov, she left for the Royal Ballet of London.

Makarova continued to excel in many different roles, most notably, her title role in Giselle. In 1989, she returned to her home theatre of the Kirov Ballet and was reunited with her family and with former colleagues and teachers. Her emotional homecoming was documented in the film Makarova Returns, which she wrote as well as presented. After her performance at the Kirov, she retired from dancing, donating her shoes and costumes to the Kirov Museum. Today Makarova stages ballets such as Swan Lake, La Bayadère and Sleeping Beauty for companies across the world. She retired from dancing due to accumulating injuries, especially to her knees. Makarova won a Tony Award, as well as numerous other stage awards for her performances in Broadway revival of On Your Toes. She played Lydia Lopokova (Lady Keynes) in Wooing in Absence, compiled by Patrick Garland. It was first performed at Charleston Farmhouse and then at the Tate Britain.

Personal life
Makarova has been married three times. Once to another ballet dancer and once to director Leonid Kvinikhidze. In 1976, Makarova married industrialist Edward Karkar, and together they had a son, Andrei.  Karkar died 22 December 2013, at the age of 81. Janet Sassoon said about Makarova,
"When I began teaching in San Francisco, through Madam Bali, I got to work with all these great Russian first dancers when they were there. So I got Natalia (Natasha) Makarova, a Prima Ballerina Assoluta. There was only one Prima Ballerina Assoluta up until the time she danced. And here I had her in my hands for five months after the birth of her child!"

Awards
1965 – Varna International Ballet Competition – Gold Medal
1969 – Honored Artist of the RSFSR
1970 – Anna Pavlova Prize & Critic's Award, Paris
1977 – Dance Magazine Award
1979 – Mother of the Year Award
1980 – A Dance Autobiography, Knopf Publishers, 1979. – Certificate of Excellence – American Institute of Graphic Arts – Selected for Exhibition
1983 – Tony Award for Best Actress in a Musical – On Your Toes (Broadway)
1983 – Drama Desk Award for Outstanding Actress in a Musical – On Your Toes (Broadway)
1983 – Theatre World Award – On Your Toes (Broadway)
1983 – Astaire Award – On Your Toes (Broadway)
1983 – Outer Critics Circle Award – On Your Toes (Broadway)
1983 – Stanislavsky Award – On Your Toes (Broadway)
1984 – Laurence Olivier Award for Best Actress in a Musical – On Your Toes, London
1985 – London Evening Standard Award – for the Best Performance of 1985 in the ballet Onegin. Presented on stage by Princess Diana after Makarova's performance of Onegin in 1986, London
1986 – Emmy Award Nomination for Ballerina a four-part documentary TV series, which was conceived, written & narrated by Makarova, BBC London/WNET
1991/92 – American Library Association Award – for Makarova's recordings of the stories Snow Maiden, The Frog Princess & Firebird – Delos Records
1993 – Distinguished Artist Award – Los Angeles
2000 – Artistic Achievement Award – Mexico
2004 – Artistic Achievement Award from the School of American Ballet
2012 – Kennedy Center Honor
2014 - "Soul of Dance" by the Russian Ballet Journal and the Russian Ministry of Culture
2018 -  Life Achievement Award by Jury of the Benois de la Danse

Work

Repertoire
As Permanent Guest Artist with American Ballet Theatre & the Royal Ballet her repertoire included:

 American Ballet Theatre: Lilac Garden; Dark Elegies; Romeo & Juliet & Pillar of Fire; Theme & Variations & Apollo; La Bayadère; Kingdom of the Shades; Coppelia; Voluntaries; La fille mal gardée; La Sylphide; Don Quixote; Nutcracker; Raymonda Act 3; Contredances; Sacre du Printemps (Tetley); Firebird; Concerto; Giselle; Swan Lake; Romeo & Juliet (MacMillan); Sleeping Beauty, Les Sylphides, Other Dances; Epilogue; Miraculous Mandarin; Pas de Quatre; The River; Études; Romeo & Juliet Pas de Deux (Tchernishov); Desir & Wild Boy.
 Royal Ballet: - Manon; Song of the Earth; A Month in the Country; Concerto; Cinderella; Voluntaries; Dances at a Gathering; Serenade; Elite Syncopations; Concerto; Checkmate; Les Biches; Kenneth MacMillan's Romeo and Juliet; Swan Lake, Giselle, The Sleeping Beauty, Les Sylphides, Van Manen's Adagio Hammerklavier; MacMillan's Pas de Deux and Ashton's Dream Pas de Deux.
 As Guest Artist with ballet companies throughout the world her repertoire included: the classical repertoire (Giselle, Swan Lake, Les Sylphides, La Sylphide) as well as Onegin (Cranko); Notre Dame de Paris, Carmen, Proust, Le Jeune Homme et la Mort (Petit); Romeo and Juliet (Cranko), Swan Lake (Cranko), Neumeier's Illusions - Like Swan Lake 2nd Act, Bach Sonata (Bejart); Nutcracker (Neumeier); Romeo & Juliet (full-length version Tchernishov); Le Rossignol (Ashton); Rosalinda (Hynd); Tchaikovsky Pas de Deux (Balanchine); Apparitions (Ashton); Afternoon of a Faun (Robbins); Meditation (Haigen) The Real McCoy (Feld) The Lesson (Flindt), The Toreador (Bourneville); Dying Swan; Corsaire Pas de Deux & Don Quixote Pas de Deux.

Original productions staged and directed by Makarova
1974 – Kingdom of the Shades  – American Ballet Theatre
1980 – La Bayadère – American Ballet Theatre
1983 – Paquita – American Ballet Theatre
1984 – Kingdom of the Shades – National Ballet of Canada
1985 – Kingdom of the Shades – London Festival Ballet
1986 – Kingdom of the Shades – Teatro Municipal – Rio de Janeiro, Brasil
1988 – Swan Lake – London Festival Ballet
1989 – La Bayadère – Royal Swedish Ballet
1989 – La Bayadère – Royal Ballet – Covent Garden – London
1991 – Paquita – National Ballet of Canada
1991 – Paquita - Universal Ballet Company of Seoul, Korea
1992 – La Bayadère – La Scala Ballet
1992 – La Bayadère – Teatro Colón, Argentina
1997 – La Bayadère – Finnish National Ballet
1997 – La Bayadère – Ballet de Santiago, Chile
1998 – La Bayadère – Australian Ballet
2000 – Kingdom of the Shades – San Francisco Ballet
2000 – Giselle – Royal Swedish Ballet
2000 – La Bayadère – Teatro Municipal, Rio de Janeiro
2001 – Swan Lake – Teatro Municipal, Rio de Janeiro
2002 – La Bayadère – Hamburg Ballet
2003 – Sleeping Beauty – Royal Ballet – Covent Garden – London
2002 – Paquita – San Francisco Ballet
2004 – La Bayadère – Theatr Wieki Opera Narodowa, Warsaw, Poland
2005 – Swan Lake – Perm Ballet Russia
2007 – La Bayadère – Dutch National Ballet
2007 – Swan Lake – National Ballet of China
2008 – La Bayadère – Corella Ballet, Teatro Real, Madrid
2009 – La Bayadère – Tokyo Ballet
2013 – La Bayadère – National Ballet of Ukraine, Kiev
2013 - Giselle   - Royal Swedish Ballet

Documentaries and other
1970 – BBC-TV – Black Swan Pas de Deux with Rudolf Nureyev & Dying Swan
1976 – Swan Lake with Ivan Nagy at the Metropolitan Opera House – Live from Lincoln Center – American Ballet Theatre.
1976 – Don Quixote Pas de deux & Giselle Act 2 (Partner Baryshnikov) BBC TV London.
1977 – Giselle with Mikhail Baryshnikov at the Metropolitan Opera House – Live From Lincoln Center - American Ballet Theatre
1978 – Don Quixote Pas de Deux with Fernando Bujones at the Metropolitan Opera House – Live From Lincoln Center – American Ballet Theatre.
1978 – Jerome Robbin's Other Dances with Mikhail Baryshnikov - WNET
1979 – Assoluta – Natalia Makarova – BBC TV, London
1979 – The Magic of Dance
1980 – Makarova's production of La Bayadère with Anthony Dowell at the Metropolitan Opera House - Live from Lincoln Center – American Ballet Theatre
1980 – Swan Lake with Anthony Dowell – Royal Ballet, Thames TV, London
1981 – The President's Command Performance– The Inaugural Gala Performance for President Elect Ronald Reagan, Kennedy Center, Washington, DC
1983 – Stars Salute the President – Ford Theatre, Washington, DC (For President Reagan)
1984 – Gala of the Stars– Proust (Petit) with Richard Cragun & Begin the Beguine (Gennaro) with Cryst, WNET, Radio City, New York
1985 – Natasha - Natalia Makarova – National Video Corporation/Kultur USA
1985 – American Ballet Theater in San Francisco– National Video Corp.
1985 – In a Class of Her Own– Natalia Makarova – THAMES TV – London
1985 – American Ballet Theatre at the Met– Makarova's PAQUITA filmed at the Metropolitan Opera House, New York
1986 – Ballerina– 4 Part series for BBC TV
1988 – The First International Erik Bruhn Competition – Guest Appearance by Natalia Makarova
1988 – Reunion With the Kirov Ballet - White Swan with Zaklinsky – BBC London live Broadcast
1988 – Romeo & Juliet (MacMillan) with Kevin Mckenzie at the Metropolitan Opera House – Live from Lincoln Center – American Ballet Theatre.
1989 – Makarova Returns – BBC-TV, London/Kultur, USA
1989 – Leningrad Legend – BBC-TV Omnibus,London/ Kultur USA
1989 – Swan Lake – Natalia Makarova's Production for London Festival Ballet
1991 – La Bayadère – Natalia Makarova's Production for the Royal Ballet – From Covent Garden – Cameras Continentales, Amaya & Thames
1991 – A Portrait of Giselle
1994 – BBC Great Railway Journeys– St. Petersburg to Tashkent - Written & Presented by Natalia Makarova
2007 – La Bayadère – Natalia Makarova's production for La Scala Ballet, Milan.
2009 – La Bayadère – Natalia Makarova's production for the Royal Ballet, Covent Garden, London.
2011 – Natalia Makarova Two Lives - Russian Documentary

See also
List of dancers
List of Russian ballet dancers
List of Eastern Bloc defectors

References

Further reading

External links

 Performances listed in Theatre Archive University of Bristol

The Ballerina Gallery - Natalia Makarova
Columbia Encyclopedia entry
Concise Encyclopædia Britannica entry

1940 births
Living people
Drama Desk Award winners
Actresses from Saint Petersburg
Kennedy Center honorees
Laurence Olivier Award winners
Prima ballerinas
Russian ballerinas
Soviet emigrants to the United States
Honored Artists of the RSFSR
Tony Award winners
Theatre World Award winners
Soviet defectors
Soviet ballerinas
20th-century Russian actresses
21st-century Russian actresses
20th-century Russian ballet dancers
21st-century Russian ballet dancers
Prix Benois de la Danse winners